Hulne Priory, Hulne Friary or Hulne Abbey was a friary founded in 1240 by the Carmelites or 'Whitefriars'. It is said that the Northumberland site, quite close to Alnwick, was chosen for some slight resemblance to Mount Carmel where the order originated.  Substantial ruins survive, watched over by the stone figures of friars carved in the 18th century. It is a sign of the unrest felt in this area so near to the border with Scotland that the priory had a surrounding wall and in the 15th century a pele tower was erected.  Changes were made at the Dissolution of the Monasteries when the Percy family took control.

The priory is situated in Hulne Park, a walled park covering several thousand acres which belongs to the Duke of Northumberland and is close to Alnwick Castle. Originally a hunting park, and still used by the Duke for shooting, it now contains woods, moors, stretches of open grassland and Alnwick's home farm. Apart from the priory, the buildings in the park include the gatehouse of the former Alnwick Abbey, and Brizlee Tower, which is a viewing tower in Gothic Revival style that dates from the 1780s.

The public is admitted to Hulne Park, but it is not marketed as a visitor attraction and has no visitor facilities. Entry is via the approach from Alnwick, and is restricted to pedestrians only. The ruins of the priory may be viewed whilst Brizlee Tower is rarely open to the public.

Hulne Priory was a filming location in HTV's Robin of Sherwood with Michael Praed where it doubled for Kirklees Abbey. Later it was Maid Marian's home in the 1991 film Robin Hood: Prince of Thieves.

The priory is licensed for wedding ceremonies and is occasionally used as a location for live performances.

See also
 Poppleton manuscript

References

External links
 Walks and Trails page at the site of the owners, Northumberland Estates
 
  Images of a walk in Hulne Park with a visit to the Priory

Alnwick
Churches in Northumberland
Carmelite monasteries in England
Monasteries in Northumberland
Peel towers in Northumberland
Tourist attractions in Northumberland
Christian monasteries established in the 13th century
13th-century establishments in England
Houses completed in the 15th century
Towers completed in the 15th century